Tjaša Tibaut (born 9 February 1989) is a retired Slovenian footballer who played as a forward. Between 2007 and 2017, she earned 49 appearances for the Slovenian national team.

References

External links
NZS profile 
Soccerway profile

1989 births
Living people
People from Murska Sobota
Slovenian women's footballers
Women's association football forwards
Slovenia women's international footballers
Slovenian expatriate sportspeople in Italy
Expatriate women's footballers in Italy
Expatriate women's footballers in Iceland
ŽNK Mura players
ŽNK Olimpija Ljubljana players
U.P.C. Tavagnacco players
Fylkir women's football players
Serie A (women's football) players
Slovenian expatriate sportspeople in Iceland